Knarvik Upper Secondary School (in Norwegian, Knarvik vidaregåande skule) is a high school located on Knarvik in Lindås, 30 km north of Bergen in Norway. The school is one of the largest in Hordaland, with over 950 pupils and about 150 employees. The school has a close connection to local industry; students can attend a program called TAF that eventually leads to both craftmanship certification and a high school degree in 4 years.

External links
School home page

Secondary schools in Norway
Lindås
Hordaland County Municipality